Arthur A. Will (May 22, 1871 – October 8, 1940) was Mayor of Louisville, Kentucky from 1925 to 1927.

Life
The son of a building contractor, Will was born in the Portland neighborhood of Louisville and educated in public schools. He dropped out at age 16 to become a carpenter, and eventually founded his own construction company with his brother, James, and built numerous buildings in Portland. He was elected to the City Council in 1907 and to the Board of Aldermen in 1917. He was elected president of that body in 1921 and 1923.

In 1925, he ran for mayor against Democratic candidate William T. Baker. Republican Party boss Chesley Searcy discovered in October that Baker had been a member of the Ku Klux Klan as recently as April 1925. After the Louisville Herald-Post broke the story, attorney Joseph T. O'Neal was appointed the emergency replacement for Baker a week before the election. Will won the election narrowly.

He was removed from office by the Kentucky Court of Appeals in 1927 after a lawsuit from Democratics successfully challenged the election results.

Afterwards he served as director of the Department of Public Works until 1933. He died in 1940 and was buried in Cave Hill Cemetery.

References

External links

1871 births
1940 deaths
Mayors of Louisville, Kentucky
Burials at Cave Hill Cemetery
People from Pewee Valley, Kentucky